Ingeld or Ingjaldr was a legendary warrior who appears in early English and Norse legends. Ingeld was so well known that, in 797, Alcuin wrote a letter to Bishop Higbald of Lindisfarne questioning the monks' interest in heroic legends with: 'Quid enim Hinieldus cum Christo?' - What has Ingeld to do with Christ? 

The legends that survive tell of Ingeld as an enemy of Hroðgar, Halga and Hroðulf. The conflict between the Scyldings Hroðgar and Hroðulf on one side, and the Heaðobards Froda and Ingeld on the other, appears both in Beowulf and in Widsith. Scholars generally agree that these characters appear in both Anglo-Saxon (Beowulf) and Scandinavian tradition (Norse sagas and Danish chronicles). However, in the Norse tradition the Heaðobards had apparently been forgotten and the conflict is instead rendered as a family feud, or as a conflict with the Saxons, where the Danes take the place of the Heaðobards.

Beowulf
In Beowulf, Ingeld is the son of King Froda of the Heaðobards, and they are involved in a war with the Danes. When Beowulf reports on his adventure in Denmark to his king Hygelac, he mentions that Hroðgar had a daughter, Freawaru. Since Froda had been killed by the Danes, Hroðgar sent Freawaru to marry Ingeld, in an unsuccessful attempt to end the feud. An old warrior urged the Heaðobards to revenge, and Beowulf predicts to Hygelac that Ingeld will turn against his father-in-law Hroðgar. In a version given in the Danish chronicle Gesta Danorum (see below), the old warrior appears as Starkad, and he succeeded in making Ingeld divorce his bride and in turning him against her family. Earlier in the Beowulf poem, the poet tells us that the hall Heorot was eventually destroyed by fire (Gummere's translation):
 

It is tempting to interpret the new war with Ingeld as leading to the burning of the hall of Heorot, but the poem separates the two events (by a ne wæs hit lenge þā meaning "nor far way was that day when", in Gummere's translation).

Widsith
Whereas Beowulf never dwells on the outcome of the battle with Ingeld, the possibly older poem Widsith refers to Hroðgar and Hroðulf defeating Ingeld at Heorot:

Skjöldunga saga and Bjarkarímur
The Skjöldunga saga and Bjarkarímur reverse the relationship between Froda and Ingeld by making Ingeld (Ingjaldus) the father of Froda (Frodo). Moreover, Ingeld is here described as the half-brother of Healfdene (Haldan).

Frodo defeated the Swedish king Jorund, made him a tributary and took his daughter. The daughter gave birth to Haldan, but another woman became Frodo's legitimate wife and gave him Ingjaldus. Together with one of his earls, Swerting, Jorund conspired against Frodo and killed him during the blót.

Haldan has a queen named Sigrith with whom he has three children: the sons Roas (Hroðgar) and Helgo (Halga) and the daughter Signy. Ingjaldus is jealous with his half-brother and so he attacks and kills Haldan, whereupon he marries Sigrith. Ingjaldus and Sigrith have two sons named Rærecus and Frodo. Ingjaldus, who is worried that his nephews would want revenge, tries to find them and kill them, but Roas and Helgo survive by hiding on an island near Skåne. When they are old enough, they avenge their father by killing Ingjaldus.

In the Hrólfr Kraki's saga, which tells very much the same story, it is Froda (Fróði) who is the half brother of Halfdan.

Gesta Danorum

The tradition of the feud with the Heaðobards Ingeld and Froda appears twice in the Gesta Danorum. There is also a third time, based on the account of the old warrior who restarts the conflict. 

The first time it tells of the feud is book 2, where Ingeld (called Ingild) appears with the son Agnar. In this version, Ingeld's son is about to marry Hroðulf's sister Rute, but a fight starts and Agnar dies in a duel with Böðvarr Bjarki (called Biarco). 

The second version in Gesta Danorum (book 6), concerns the adventures of Starkad, and which is based on the old warrior who restarted the conflict. The Danish king Frotho (Froda) was killed through treachery by a Saxon named Swerting (Swertingus). Frotho's son Ingeld (Ingellus) lived a wanton life and married one of Swerting's daughters. This angered Starkad so much that he enlisted at the Swedish king Halfdan's (Haldanus) court instead. As Ingeld continued his sinful life and did not do his duty to avenge his father, Starkad appeared during a banquet that Ingeld had with the sons of Swerting, his father's slayer. Starkad strongly admonished Ingeld and humiliated his queen who tried to calm Starkad with kindness and her costly ribbon. Starkad succeeded in inciting Ingeld to kill Swerting's sons and to divorce his Saxon bride.

The third time, it tells of Froda and Ingeld is in book 7, but here Hroðgar is replaced by a Harald and Halga by a Haldanus. It is the same Ingeld as in the previous paragraph, but here Froda reappears as Ingeld's son. It is a version of the feud that is similar to the one told in the Skjöldunga saga, Bjarkarímur and Hrólfr Kraki's saga, where the Heaðobards had been forgotten and the feud with Froda and Ingeld has become a family feud. The main plot is that Ingeld has the sons Frodo (Froda) and Harald (corresponds to Healfdene). The relationship between Ingeld and Froda was thus reversed, a reversal also found in the Skjöldunga saga and in the Bjarkarímur. Froda kills his brother and tries to get rid of his nephews Harald (corresponds to Hroðgar) and Haldanus (corresponds to Halga). After some adventures, the two brothers burn their uncle to death inside his house and avenge their father.

Notes

Sources
Nerman, Birger (1925). "Det svenska rikets uppkomst".
Beowulf:
 Beowulf read aloud in Old English
 Modern English translation by Francis Barton Gummere
 Modern English translation by John Lesslie Hall
 Ringler, Dick. Beowulf: A New Translation For Oral Delivery, May 2005. Searchable text with full audio available, from the University of Wisconsin-Madison Libraries.
 Several different Modern English translations
Widsith:
Widsith, A Verse Translation by Douglas B. Killings
Widsith, a translation by Bella Millett
Chronicon Lethrense and Annales Lundense:
 Chronicon Lethrense and Annales Lundenses in translation by Peter Tunstall
 The same translation at Northvegr
Gesta Danorum:
 Book 2 of Gesta Danorum at the Online Medieval & Classical library
Book 6 of Gesta Danorum at the Online Medieval & Classical library
 Book 7 of Gesta Danorum at the Online Medieval & Classical library
 The Relation of the Hrolfs Saga Kraka and the Bjarkarimur to Beowulf by Olson, 1916, at Project Gutenberg
 Hrólf Kraki's saga in English translation at Northvegr

Characters in Beowulf
English heroic legends
Heroes in Norse myths and legends